Hennrich is a surname. Notable people with the surname include:

 Kurt Hennrich (1931–2020), Czech alpine skier
 Michael Hennrich (born 1965), German lawyer and politician
 Oskar Hennrich, German World War I flying ace

See also
 Heinrich (surname)
 Henrich